Hermetic Qabalah is a Western esoteric tradition involving mysticism and the occult. It is the underlying philosophy and framework for magical societies such as the Golden Dawn, Thelemic orders, mystical-religious societies such as the Builders of the Adytum and the Fellowship of the Rosy Cross, and is a precursor to the Neopagan, Wiccan and New Age movements. The Hermetic Qabalah is the basis for Qliphothic Qabala as studied by left-hand path orders, such as the Typhonian Order.

Hermetic Qabalah arose alongside and united with the Christian Cabalistic involvement in the European Renaissance, becoming variously Esoteric Christian, non-Christian, or anti-Christian across its different schools in the modern era. It draws on a great many influences, most notably: Jewish Kabbalah, Western astrology, Alchemy, Pagan religions, especially Egyptian and Greco-Roman (it is from the latter that the term "Hermetic" is derived), neoplatonism, gnosticism, the Enochian system of angelic magic of John Dee and Edward Kelley, hermeticism, tantra and the symbolism of the tarot. Hermetic Qabalah differs from the Jewish form in being a more admittedly syncretic system, however it shares many concepts with Jewish Kabbalah.

Teachings

Conception of Divinity
A primary concern of Hermetic Qabalah is the nature of divinity, its conception of which is quite markedly different from that presented in monotheistic religions; in particular there is not the strict separation between divinity and humankind which is seen in classical monotheism. Hermetic Qabalah adheres to the Neoplatonic conception that the manifest universe, of which material creation is a part, arose as a series of “emanations” from the “godhead”.

These emanations arise out of three preliminary states that are considered to precede manifestation. The first is a state of complete nullity, known as Ain ( "nothing"); the second state, considered a "concentration" of Ain, is Ain Suph ( "without limit, infinite"); the third state, caused by a "movement" of Ain Suph, is Ain Suph Aur ( "limitless light"), and it is from this initial brilliance that the first emanation of creation originates.

The Sephiroth in Hermetic Qabalah

The emanations of creation arising from Ain Suph Aur are ten in number, and are called Sephiroth (singular Sephirah , "enumeration"). These are conceptualised somewhat differently in Hermetic Qabalah to the way they are in Jewish Kabbalah.

From Ain Suph Aur crystallises Kether, the first sephirah of the Hermetic Qabalistic tree of life. From Kether emanate the rest of the sephirot in turn, viz. Kether (1), Chokhmah (2), Binah (3), Daath, Chesed (4), Geburah (5), Tiphareth (6), Netzach (7), Hod (8), Yesod (9), Malkuth (10). Daath is not assigned a number as it is considered part of Binah or a hidden sephirah.

Each sephirah is considered to be an emanation of the divine energy (often described as 'the divine light') which ever flows from the unmanifest, through Kether into manifestation. This flow of light is indicated by the lightning flash shown on diagrams of the sephirotic tree which passes through each sephirah in turn according to their enumerations.

Each sephirah is a nexus of divine energy, and each has a number of attributions. These attributions enable the Qabalist to form a comprehension of each particular sephirah's characteristics. This manner of applying many attributions to each sephirah is an exemplar of the diverse nature of Hermetic Qabalah. For example, the sephirah Hod has the attributions of: Glory, perfect intelligence, the eights of the tarot deck, the planet Mercury, the Egyptian god Thoth, the archangel Michael, the Roman god Mercury and the alchemical element Mercury. The general principle involved is that the Qabalist will meditate on all these attributions and by this means to acquire an understanding of the character of the sephirah including all its correspondences.

Tarot and the Tree of Life

Hermetic Qabalists see the cards of the tarot as keys to the Tree of Life. The 22 cards including the 21 Trumps plus the Fool or Zero card are often called the "Major Arcana" or "Greater Mysteries" and are seen as corresponding to the 22 Hebrew letters and the 22 paths of the Tree; the ace to ten in each suit correspond to the ten Sephiroth in the four Qabalistic worlds; and the sixteen court cards relate to the classical elements in the four worlds. While the sephiroth describe the nature of divinity, the paths between them describe ways of knowing the Divine.

Orders of angels
According to the Hermetic Order of the Golden Dawn's interpretation of the Kabbalah, there are ten archangels, each commanding one of the choirs of angels and corresponding to one of the Sephirot. It is similar to the Jewish angelic hierarchy.

History

Hermetic views of Qabalah origins

Both Jewish tradition and mainstream academic scholarship understand Kabbalah to have originated from within the Judaism, developing concepts and ideas from earlier Medieval Jewish neoplatonism. In the mid-twentieth century, Gershom Scholem hypothesized that Medieval Kabbalah had its roots in an earlier Jewish version of Gnosticism, however contemporary scholarship of Jewish mysticism has largely rejected this idea. Moshe Idel instead has posited a historical continuity of development from early Jewish mysticism. 

In contrast, Hermeticists have taken different views of Qabalah's origins. Some authors see the origins of Qabalah not in Semitic/Jewish mysticism or ancient Egyptian Gnosticism, but in a western tradition originating in classical Greece with Indo-European cultural roots, later adopted by Jewish mystics. According to this view, "Hermetic Qabalah" would be the original Qabalah, even though the word itself is Judaic Hebrew, over the Christian Cabalah or the Jewish Kabbalah.

Renaissance occultism

Jewish Kabbalah was absorbed into the Hermetic tradition at least as early as the 15th century when Giovanni Pico della Mirandola promoted a syncretic worldview combining Platonism, Neoplatonism, Aristotelianism, Hermeticism and Kabbalah. Heinrich Cornelius Agrippa (1486–1535), a German magician, occult writer, theologian, astrologer, and alchemist, wrote the influential Three Books of Occult Philosophy, incorporating Kabbalah in its theory and practice of Western magic. It contributed strongly to the Renaissance view of ritual magic's relationship with Christianity. Pico's Hermetic syncretism was further developed by Athanasius Kircher, a Jesuit priest, hermeticist and polymath, who wrote extensively on the subject in 1652, bringing further elements such as Orphism and Egyptian mythology to the mix.

Enlightenment era esoteric societies

Once Hermeticism was no longer endorsed by the Christian Church it was driven underground and a number of Hermetic brotherhoods were formed. With the Enlightenment Age of Reason and its skepticism of mainstream religion, the tradition of exoteric-theological Christian Cabala declined, while esoteric-occult Hermetic Qabalah flourished in the Western mystery tradition. Non-Jewish Cabala, unlike in Judaic Kabbalah's mainstream censure of its magical side, became a central component of Western occult, magic and divination.

Rosicrucianism and esoteric branches of Freemasonry taught religious philosophies, Qabalah, and divine magic in progressive steps of initiation. Their esoteric teachings, and secret society structure of an outer body governed by a restricted inner level of adepts, laid the format for modern esoteric organisations.

Nineteenth-century magical revival

Post-Enlightenment Romanticism encouraged societal interest in occultism, of which Hermetic Qabalistic writing was a feature. Francis Barrett's The Magus (1801) handbook of ceremonial magic gained little notice until it influenced the French magical enthusiast Eliphas Levi (1810–1875). His fanciful literary embellishments of magical invocations presented Qabalism as synonymous with both so-called White and so-called Black magic. Levi's innovations included attributing the Hebrew letters to the Tarot cards, thus formulating a link between Western magic and Jewish esotericism which has remained fundamental ever since in Western magic. Levi had a deep impact on the magic of the Hermetic Order of the Golden Dawn. Through the occultists inspired by him (including Aleister Crowley, who considered himself Levi's reincarnation) Levi is remembered as one of the key founders of the 20th-century revival of magic.

Hermetic Order of the Golden Dawn

Hermetic Qabalah was developed extensively by the Hermetic Order of the Golden Dawn, Within the Golden Dawn, the fusing of Qabalistic principles such as the ten Sephiroth with Greek and Egyptian deities was made more cohesive and was extended to encompass other systems such as the Enochian system of angelic magic of John Dee and certain Eastern (particularly Hindu and Buddhist) concepts, all within the structure of a Masonic or Rosicrucian style esoteric order.

Aleister Crowley, who passed through the Golden Dawn before going on to form his own magical orders, is the most widely known exponent of Hermetic Magic or Magick as he preferred to spell it. Crowley's book Liber 777 is a good illustration of the wider Hermetic approach. It is a set of tables of correspondences relating various parts of ceremonial magic and Eastern and Western religion to the thirty-two numbers representing the ten spheres (Sephiroth) plus the twenty-two paths of the Qabalistic Tree of Life. The panentheistic nature of Hermetic Qabalists is plainly evident here, as one may simply check the table to see that Chesed (חסד "Mercy") corresponds to Jupiter, Isis, the colour blue (on the Queen Scale), Poseidon, Brahma, and amethyst.

After the Golden Dawn

Many of the Golden Dawn's rituals were published by Crowley, altered in various ways to align them with his own New Aeon magickal approach. Israel Regardie eventually compiled the more traditional forms of these rituals and published them in book form.

Dion Fortune, an initiate of Alpha et Omega (an offshoot of the Golden Dawn), who went on to found the Fraternity of the Inner Light wrote the seminal book The Mystical Qabalah, widely considered one of the best general introductions to modern Hermetic Qabalah.

Paul Foster Case (1884–1954) was an American occultist and author of influential books on occult tarot and Qabalah. He founded the Builders of the Adytum (B.O.T.A) mystery school, rooted in the Hermetic Order of the Golden Dawn and the Masonic blue lodge system, later extended by Ann Davies. B.O.T.A. teaches esoteric psychology, occult tarot, Hermetic Qabalah, astrology, and meditation.

Pat Zalewski is a student of Jack Taylor, who was, in turn, a student of Robert Felkin's Golden Dawn school, as taught in New Zealand after Felkin emigrated there. Zalewski has published numerous works on Hermetic Qabalah and the Golden Dawn tradition.

Samael Aun Weor has written many significant works that discuss Kabbalah within many religions, such as the Egyptian, Pagan, and Central American religions, which is summarized in his work The Initiatic Path in the Arcana of Tarot and Kabbalah.

See also

References

Further reading 
 Aleister Crowley. 777 and Other Qabalistic Writings of Aleister Crowley
 Robert Wang. The Qabbalistic Tarot
 Paul A. Clark, The Hermetic Qabalah, Fraternity of the Hidden Light, 1999.
 Dion Fortune, The Mystical Qabalah Aziloth Books, 2012.
 Lon Milo DuQuette,The Chicken Qabalah of Rabbi Lamed Ben Clifford: Dilettante's Guide to What You Do and Do Not Need to Know to Become a Qabalist, Weiser Books 2001.
 John Michael Greer. Paths of Wisdom: A Guide to the Magical Cabala, Thoth Publications 2007.
 Moshe Idel, Kabbalah: New Perspectives, New Haven and London, Yale University Press 1988.
 Thomas Karlsson. Qabalah, Qliphoth and Goetic Magic. Ajna Bound. Third edition. 2012
 Israel Regardie A Garden of Pomegranates: Skrying on the Tree of Life, Llewellyn Publications 1995.
 Kocku von Stuckrad (ed,), Kabbalah and Modernity: Interpretations, Transformations, Adaptations, Leiden, Brill 2010.

External links
Survey of Occultism in the Renaissance
Web of Qabalah website
Hermetic Kabbalah website

 
Esoteric schools of thought
Hermeticism
Kabbalah